Euphorbia emirnensis is a species of plant in the family Euphorbiaceae. It is found in Comoros, Madagascar, and Mayotte. Its natural habitat is subtropical or tropical high-altitude grassland. It is threatened by habitat loss.

References

emirnensis
Least concern plants
Taxonomy articles created by Polbot
Taxa named by John Gilbert Baker